Gul Mohammed Arefi was Governor of Badghis Province in Afghanistan from 2001 to 2005.

References

Governors of Badghis Province
Living people
Year of birth missing (living people)